Koufax may refer to:

Sandy Koufax (born 1935), Major League Baseball Hall of Fame pitcher
Koufax (band), an indie rock band
Koufax EP, an extended play by the band Koufax

See also
Kofax